Nu Arietis, Latinized from ν Arietis, is the Bayer designation for a white-hued star in the northern constellation of Aries. It is faintly visible to the naked eye with an apparent visual magnitude of +5.43. Based upon an annual parallax shift of 9.68 mas as seen from Earth, it is located roughly 340 light years from the Sun. It is moving away from the Sun with a radial velocity of 8 km/s.

This is an A-type main sequence star with a stellar classification of A7 V. Nu Arietis has an estimated 2.4 times the mass of the Sun and about 1.8 times the Sun's radius. The star is radiating 63.5 times the Sun's luminosity from its photosphere at an effective temperature of around 8,000 K. It is roughly 621 million years old and is spinning with a projected rotational velocity of 133 km/s. A close companion was discovered in 2016 using the direct spectral detection method.

References

External links
Aladin previewer
Aladin sky atlas
 HR 773

A-type main-sequence stars
Arietis, Nu
Aries (constellation)
Durchmusterung objects
Arietis, 32
016432
012332
0773